Qiu Shihua (born 1940) is a Chinese landscape painter. He lives and works in Beijing and Shenzhen.

Life and work
Qiu Shihua was born in 1940 in Zizhong, Sichuan, China, and lives and works in Beijing and Shenzhen. He visited France in the 1980s and studied the works of the Impressionists.

His works have been exhibited in shows including the 48th Venice Biennale, the 23rd São Paulo Art Biennial, the Kunsthalle Basel and the Exhibition "Mahjong - Chinesische Gegenwartskunst aus der Sammlung Sigg" which has been shown in Europe and the U.S.A. Qiu Shihua is represented by Galerie Urs Meile, Beijing-Lucerne.

Publications
Situation Kunst (für Max Imdahl) (Ed.), (2018). scheinbar: nichts. Bildwelten von Qiu Shihua im Dialog / apparently: nothing. Qiu Shihua's Pictorial Worlds in Dialog. Bochum: Stiftung Situation Kunst, 2018.
Nationalgalerie Berlin, Museum Pfalzgalerie Kaiserslautern (Eds.), (2012). Qiu Shihua. Duesseldorf: Richter & Fey, 2012.
Kunsthalle Basel (Ed.) (1999). Qui Shi-hua. Basel: Schwabe & Co. AG Verlag.
Mao, C. W. (Ed.). (2005). Insight. Paintings by Qiu Shihua. New York: Chambers Fine Art.
  Galerie Rudolfinum (Ed.) (2000). Qiu Shi-hua. Landscape Painting. Prague.

Selected bibliography
Berswordt-Wallrabe, S. von (2018). Endlos, ortlos, schwerelos. Flüchtige Bildwelten von Qiu Shihua / Beyond finiteness, place and gravity. Qiu Shihua's fleeting pictorial worlds. In: scheinbar: nichts / apparently: nothing. exh. cat. Situation Kunst, Bochum (2018), pp. 7–26 and pp. 165–174.
Berswordt-Wallrabe, S. von (2014). Verflüchtigung und Konkretion. Die Malerei von Qiu Shihua – im Hinblick auf die Bernwardtür. In: Michael Brandt, Gerd Winner (Hrsg.): Übergänge / Transitions. Gotthard Graubner – Bernwardtür – Qiu Shihua, exh. cat. Roemer- und Pelizaeus-Museum Hildesheim, Hildesheim 2014, pp. 48–57.
Berswordt-Wallrabe, S. von (2012). Between presence and absence. Qiu Shihua's landscape painting. In: Qiu Shihua (Cat. Nationalgalerie Berlin and Museum Pfalzgalerie Kaiserslautern), Düsseldorf: Richter & Fey, pp. 10–45.
Berswordt-Wallrabe, S. von (2012). At the Threshold of (In-)Visibility. The 'White' Landscape Paintings by Qiu Shihua. In: Birgit Hopfener, Franziska Koch, Jeong-hee Lee-Kalisch, Juliane Noth (Eds.): Negotiating Difference. Contemporary Chinese Art in the Global Context (documenting an international conference held at Freie Universität Berlin/Haus der Kulturen der Welt, 2009), Weimar 2012, pp. 87–97.
Berswordt-Wallrabe, S. von (2010). Qiu Shihua. In: Weltsichten. Landschaft in der Kunst seit dem 17. Jahrhundert (Catalogue Situation Kunst Bochum, Kunsthalle zu Kiel, Museum Wiesbaden, Kunstsammlungen Chemnitz, Bonnefantenmuseum Maastricht). Cologne: Wienand Verlag. pp. 260–262, 327.
Gerlach, P. (2007). Qiu Shihua. In: Idylle. Traum und Trugschluss Idyll. Illusion and Delusion (Catalogue, Zybok, O. Ed.). Ostfildern: Hatje Cantz Verlag. pp. 204–207.
Rasche, S. (2007). White Out – Künstlerische Expeditionen in ungesicherte Bereiche. In: White Out (Catalogue). Bregenz: Berufsvereinigung Bildender Künstlerinnen und Künstler Vorarlberg. pp. 34–36, 75.
  Tinari, P. (2007). Qiu Shihua. In: China Art Book. The 80 most renowned Chinese artists. Cologne: DuMont Buchverlag. pp. 296–303.
Köppel-Yang, M. (1999). Qiu Shi-hua. Geschmack an der Fadheit. In: Qui Shi-hua (Kunsthalle Basel, Ed.). Basel: Schwabe & Co. AG Verlag.
Tancock, J. (2005). Qiu Shi-hua. In: Insight. Paintings by Qiu Shihua (Catalogue, Mao, C. W., Ed.). New York: Chambers Fine Art.
  Lai Chi-Tim (2000). The Nature of the Dao. In: Qiu Shi-hua. Landscape Painting. Prague: Galerie Rudolfinum. pp. 7–9.
Yan Shanchun (2000). ‘Landscape’ Painting in the Eyes of the Chinese. In: Qiu Shi-hua. Landscape Painting. Prague: Galerie Rudolfinum. pp. 11–21.
Chang Tsong-zung (2000). The Sky in the Landscape. In: Qiu Shi-hua. Landscape Painting. Prague: Galerie Rudolfinum. pp. 23–30.
Wechsler, M. (1999). Malerei am äussersten Rand. Langsamkeit der Malerei. In extremis. In: Qui Shi-hua (Kunsthalle Basel, Ed.). Basel: Schwabe & Co. AG Verlag.

Exhibitions

Solo exhibitions
2018/19 Situation Kunst (für Max Imdahl), Kunstsammlungen der Ruhr-Universität Bochum, Bochum, Germany
2012/13 Museum Pfalzgalerie Kaiserslautern, Germany
2012 Nationalgalerie im Hamburger Bahnhof Berlin, Germany
2005   Galerie Urs Meile, Lucerne, Switzerland
Insight: Paintings by Qiu Shihua, Chambers Fine Art, New York, NY, US 
2004   Qiu Shihua, Künstlerverein Malkasten, Düsseldorf, Germany
2002   White Landscape, Pruss & Ochs Gallery, Berlin, Germany
2001   Landscape – Painting on the Edge of Visibility, Galleria OTSO, Espoo, Finland
2000   Qiu Shihua – Landscape Painting, Rudolfinum, Prague, Czech Republic
1999   Qiu Shihua, Kunsthalle Basel, Basel, Switzerland
1997   Qiu Shihua, Hanart TZ Gallery, Hong Kong, Taiwan, China
1995   Qiu Shihua, Hanart TZ Gallery, Hong Kong, China
1991   Qiu Shihua, Hanart TZ Gallery, Hong Kong, Taiwan, China
1990   Qiu Shihua, Alliance Française, Hong Kong, China

Group exhibitions
2010 "Weltsichten. Landschaft in der Kunst seit dem 17. Jahrhundert"; Situation Kunst (für Max Imdahl), Bochum; travelled to: Kunsthalle zu Kiel (2011), Museum Wiesbaden (2011), Kunstsammlungen Chemnitz (2012), Museum Dieselkraftwerk Cottbus (2012/13), Bonnefantenmuseum Maastricht (2014), Weserburg Bremen (2015), Kunsthalle Rostock (2015)
2008   Qi Yun, ChinaSquare, New York
2007   "Mahjong - Chinesische Gegenwartskunst aus der Sammlung Sigg", Museum der Moderne, Salzburg, Austria
Qi Yun – - "Qi Yun – the international traveling exhibition of Chinese abstractart", OCT contemporary art terminal of He Xiangnin museum, Shenzhen, China
"Art from China – Collection Uli Sigg", Centro Cultural Banco do Brasil, Rio de Janeiro, Brazil
"The Year of the Golden Pig – Contemporary Chinese Art from the Sigg Collection", Lewis Glucksman Gallery, University College, Cork, Ireland
"White Out", Künstlerhaus Palais Thurn und Taxis, Bregenz, Austria / Stadtgalerie Saarbrücken, Saarbrücken, Germany
"The Sublime is Now", Museum Franz Gertsch, Burgdorf, Switzerland
2006   "Mahjong - Chinesische Gegenwartskunst aus der Sammlung Sigg”, Hamburger Kunsthalle, Hamburg, Germany
2005   “PICTORIAL DNA made in China”, Galerie Urs Meile, Lucerne, Switzerland
"Mahjong - Chinesische Gegenwartskunst aus der Sammlung Sigg“, Kunstmuseum Bern, Bern, Switzerland
"CHINA: as seen BY CONTEMPORARY CHINESE ARTISTS", Provincia di Milano, Spazio Oberdan, Italy 
2004   Shanghai Biennale, Shanghai, China
Le Printemps de Chine", CRAC Alsace, France 
2003   New Zone – Chinese Art, Zacheta National Gallery of Art, Warsaw, Poland
Einbildung – Das Wahmehmen in der Kunst, Kunsthaus Graz, Austria 
2002   China – Tradition und Moderne, Ludwig Galerie Schloss Oberhausen, Germany
Welcome China !, Gallery Soardi, Nice, France 
2001   The Inward Eye: Transcendence in Contemporary Art, Contemporary Art Museum, Houston, Texas, US
2nd Berlin Biennale, Berlin, Germany 
2000   Our Chinese Friends, ACC Gallery Weimar & Galerie the Bauhaus University, Weimar, Germany
1999   d'APERTutto, 48th La Biennale di Venezia, Venice, Italy
Natural Reality, Forum Ludwig, Aachen, Germany 
1998   Eight Chinese Artists, Asian Fine Art Gallery, Berlin, Germany
1996   China, Bonn, Vienna, Singapore, Copenhagen, Warsaw, Berlin, Germany
23rd International Biennale, São Paulo, Brazil (As a special guest)
Haus der Kulturen der Welt, Berlin, Germany 
1995   China's New Art Post-1989, US
1992   The First Annual Exhibition of Chinese Oil Painting, Hong Kong, China
1986   Chinese Art Festival, organized by La Défense in Paris, France

References

External links 
 Qiu Shihua at the Galerie m Bochum

1940 births
Living people
Chinese contemporary artists
People's Republic of China landscape painters
Painters from Sichuan
People from Neijiang